Sham 69 are an English punk rock band that formed in Hersham in Surrey in 1975. They were one of the most successful punk bands in the United Kingdom, achieving five top 20 singles, including "If the Kids Are United" and "Hurry Up Harry". The group's popularity saw them perform on the BBC’s Top of the Pops, and they appeared in the rockumentary film, D.O.A.. The original unit broke up in 1979, with frontman Jimmy Pursey moving on to pursue a solo career.

In 1987, Pursey and guitarist David Parsons reformed the band, joined by new personnel. Although subsequently going through a number of line-up changes, Sham 69 remained active and were still playing gigs as of 2022.

History

Formation
Sham 69 formed in Hersham, Surrey in 1975, although originally known (according to some sources) as Jimmy and the Ferrets. 'Sham 69' is said to have derived from a piece of graffiti that co-founder Jimmy Pursey saw on a wall. It originally said Walton and Hersham '69 but had partly faded away, and made reference to when Walton & Hersham F.C. secured the Athenian League title in 1969.

The 12 November 1976 issue of NME noted that Sham 69 was rehearsing in 1976, although only Pursey would remain from this early line-up twelve months later. Original guitarists Johnny Goodfornothing (a.k.a. John Goode) and Neil Harris were replaced by Dave Parsons, and drummer Billy Bostik (a.k.a. Andy Nightingale) by Mark Cain. Albie Slider (a.k.a. Albie Maskell) remained for the group's first single in 1977 before being replaced by Dave Tregunna. The Pursey/Parsons/Tregunna/Cain line up then remained stable until 1979, when Ricky Goldstein took over on drums for the band's fourth album.

Sham 69 did not have the art school background of many English punk bands of the time, and brought in football chant backup vocals and an implicit political populism. The band attracted a large skinhead following (left wing, right wing and non-political). Their concerts were plagued by violence, and the band ceased live performances after a 1979 concert at the Rainbow Theatre in Finsbury Park was broken up by National Front-supporting white power skinheads fighting and rushing the stage.

Recordings
Sham 69 released their first single, "I Don't Wanna", on Step Forward Records in August 1977, produced by John Cale (formerly of the Velvet Underground), and its success in the independent charts prompted Polydor Records to sign the band. Their major label debut was "Borstal Breakout" in January 1978, followed by UK Singles Chart success with "Angels with Dirty Faces" (reaching No. 19 in May 1978) and "If the Kids Are United" (No. 9 in July 1978). These were not included on the group's debut album, Tell Us the Truth, a mixture of live and studio recordings.

The group had further chart success with "Hurry Up Harry" (No. 10 in October 1978), which came from their second LP and first full studio album, That's Life. The band's popularity was enhanced by their performances on Top of the Pops, and the band performed in the film, D.O.A. around this time (although the film was not released until 1980). Sham 69 would ultimately be one of the most successful UK punk rock bands, releasing five singles that cracked the Top 20 of the UK Singles Chart.

The band eventually started to move away from punk rock, to embrace a sound heavily influenced by classic British rock bands such as Mott the Hoople, The Who, the Rolling Stones and Faces. This was demonstrated by their third album, The Adventures of the Hersham Boys.

Demise
The original incarnation of Sham 69 disbanded in 1980, following the release of the band's fourth album, The Game. Pursey was enormously critical of the album, calling it "a pile of shit" in a 1989 Flipside interview, noting:

"I was forced into making it, you understand? I called it The Game because that's how the music business had become to me. Like a little roulette wheel where everything we did had all of this political value to it, but it didn't make any difference because you spin the wheel and if it landed on the right number you were all right, the wrong number and you were not all right."

Pursey formed the short-lived band Sham Pistols with former Sex Pistols members Steve Jones and Paul Cook, before moving on to a solo recording career. Pursey's first solo album was with Polydor Records, the label for which Sham 69 had recorded, but was a commercial and critical failure. The second solo album, Alien Orphans, was recorded with CBS Records France. For his third solo album, Revenge Is Not the Password, Pursey paid for the recording out of his own pocket in order to maintain artistic freedom.

In 1981, Pursey collaborated with Peter Gabriel on the single "Animals Have More Fun" which was commercially unsuccessful. He also became occupied with video production in London, making use of snippets of found video in an effort "to do something really anarchic."

Rick Goldstein, Dave Parsons, and Dave Tregunna joined the 1980s glam punk/gothic rock band the Wanderers with Stiv Bators of the Dead Boys. Tregunna and Bators later recruited Nick Turner of the Barracudas and Brian James of the Damned to form the Lords of the New Church.

Re-establishment

1987 and later
In 1987 Pursey and Parsons resurrected Sham 69 with new members; Ian Whitewood on drums, Andy Prince on bass, Tony Hardie-Bick ("Tony Bic") on keyboards and Linda Paganelli on saxophone, releasing the album Volunteer  and the singles "Rip and Tear" and "Outside the Warehouse". The album Live at CBGB's also features this line-up. The next studio album, Information Libre, has Patricia de Mayo on keyboards. Andy Prince went on to join the Magic Mushroom Band, and Whitewood was replaced on drums by Sonny Boy Williamson, who played on the Soapy Water and Mister Marmalade album and the singles "Uptown", "Action Time & Vision" and "Girlfriend".

2006 break-up and aftermath
In late 2006, Sham 69 broke up and Dave Parsons stated his wish to independently continue as 'Sham 69'. On 26 January 2007, BBC News announced that Sham 69 had split because of a bitter fallout between Pursey and Parsons. NME reported that a statement released by Parsons included the message: "Sham 69 have left Jimmy Pursey on the eve of their 30th anniversary. The band had become increasingly fed up with Jimmy's lack of interest in playing live and continually letting down both promoters and fans by pulling out of gigs at the last moment". Parsons and Whitewood continued as Sham 69 with Tim V on vocals and Rob Jefferson on bass. This line-up performed tours of the United States, played at many punk festivals across Europe, and released the album, Hollywood Hero, in August 2007.

Pursey and Sargent formed a new band Day 21 with Rev & Snell from Towers of London.  The band was named after the last Sham 69 album and also to avoid confusion with the fans over the name. Day 21 recorded an album titled 4:10am which was not released, although a single,  "Having It Rock and Roll", was released in 2008.
 
Bassist Rob Jefferson left Parsons' Sham 69 and was replaced by the former U.K. Subs member Alan Campbell. In 2009, Sham 69 was the first major punk band to tour China. They released an album titled Who Killed Joe Public, in late 2010.

2011–present
In May 2011, Parsons stated on his website that he had disbanded Sham 69, although this was disputed by the other members.  In July 2011, Pursey announced on Twitter the re-formation of most of the 1977 line-up, comprising Pursey, Parsons and Tregunna. This meant that there were two active bands using the same name, with three of the classic line-up (Pursey, Parsons and Tregunna) in one band, and Harris in the other. In June 2012, Pursey registered the name as a trademark. As of 2016, both bands are still touring using the name, with the Pursey version often using the "Original 1977 line-up" tagline, and the other using the "Tim V" name.

On 28 January 2018, Sham 69 co-founder Neil Harris died from cancer at the age of 63.

Legacy
Sham 69 have been cited as a major influence on the Oi! musical subgenre of UK punk in the late 1970s, and also on the working class street punk musical subgenre of the 1980s.

Members

Timeline

Current
 Jimmy Pursey – vocals (1975–1980, 1987–2006, 2011–present)
 Dave Parsons – guitar (1977–1980, 1987–present)
 Dave Tregunna – bass (1977–1980, 2011–present)
 Robin Guy – drums (2012 –present)

Former
 Neil Harris – lead guitar (1975–1977, 2011–2018; died 2018)
 Pete Nash – (1975)
 Jonathan Phillips – rhythm guitar, songwriting, vocals (1975)
 John Goode – rhythm guitar (1975–1977)
 Albie Slider (Albert Maskell) – bass (1975–1977)
 Andy Prince – bass (1987–1991)
 Mat Sargent – bass (1995–2007)
 Billy Bostik – drums (1975–1977)
 Mark Cain – drums (1977–1979)
 Ricky Goldstein – drums (1979–1980)
 Sonny Boy Williamson – drums (1990)
 Tony Bic – keyboards (1987–1988)
 Linda Paganelli – saxophone (1987–1991)
 Rob "Zee" Jefferson – bass (2007–2009)
 Danny Fury – drums (2011–2012)

Current (Tim V version)
 Tim V – vocals (2007–present)
 Paul Brightman – guitar (2014–present)
 Tom Austin-Morgan – bass (2021–present)
 Ian Whitewood – drums (1987–present)

Former
 Neil Harris – guitar (2011–2017)
 Tony Feedback – guitar (2011–2014)
 Billy Wood – bass (2015–2016)
 John Woodward – bass (2009–2018)
 Ryan Monshall – bass (2018-2021)

Discography

Albums

Singles

Source:

Compilation albums
The First, the Best and the Last (1980)
The Punk Singles Collection 1977–80 (1998)
Angels With Dirty Faces 2-CD Anthology (1999) (Castle Music ESDCD 780)
Laced Up Boots and Corduroys (2000)
If The Kids Are United - The Best of Sham 69 (2001)
The Best of Sham 69: Cockney Kids Are Innocent (2002)
The Complete Collection: 3-disc (2004)
Sham 69 - Set List: The Anthology (Re-recorded Greatest Hits on CD & LP) - Secret Records
Hurry Up Harry: The Collection (2017)

Compilation appearances
Lords of Oi!  (1997)
Teenage Kicks (4 April 2005)
The Original Punk Album (2007)
Punk 77/2007 30th Anniversary (2007)*
DOA movie, Rip Off" Performed by Sham 69; recorded live at Roundhouse Studios
"Borstal Breakout" Performed by Sham 69; recorded live at Roundhouse Studios (1981)

Live albumsLive and Loud!! (1987)The Complete Sham 69 Live (1989)Live at the Roxy Club (1990)Live in Italy (1996)Live at CBGB's (1998)Green Eggs & Sham (1999)SHAM 69 Live'' (2011)

Notes

References

External links
Website of Sham 69/PURSEY
Website of Sham 69/Tim V
BBC article on use of Sham 69 song at Labour Party conference

Musical groups from London
English punk rock groups
Oi! groups
Musical groups established in 1975
Musical groups disestablished in 1979
Musical groups reestablished in 1987
Parlophone artists
Polydor Records artists
Skinhead
Street punk groups
1975 establishments in England
Musical groups from Surrey